Cours Hattemer is a French private, secular school. It is independent of the state, and can follow its own teaching approach, which is structured and places great stress on repetition to drive home what has been learned. The school has many well-known alumni including the actress Brigitte Bardot and the French President Jacques Chirac.

Hattemer is located in Paris, in the 8th and 16th districts.

Description

The school was founded by Rose Hattemer of Alsace in 1885.
The founder taught some of the great Parisian families towards the end of the 19th century, and developed a method of teaching by correspondence for the children of diplomats, which is still followed today.
The school was originally located on rue Clapeyron in the 8th arrondissement of Paris.
It is now housed in a five-story building erected nearby on rue de Londres in 1935 to accommodate a growing number of pupils.
There is a cafeteria, gym and playground.

The school provides flexible hours, so a student may take time to practice an instrument or train for a sport.
When Brigitte Bardot was admitted to the Cours Hattemer at the age of seven during World War II (1939–45) she only had to go to school three days a week, and otherwise studied at home. This gave her time to take dancing lessons.
In the period after World War II the school was one of the few that encouraged art, and thereby attracted pupils from the families of actors or public figures.
It catered to children who were "special cases" such as Françoise Sagan and her classmate Florence Malraux, daughter of André Malraux, who attended in the early 1950s.

There are about 1,500 students from kindergarten to the Baccalauréat (high school certificate), half of whom learn by correspondence.
Classes have 15–25 students.

Syllabus

Hattemer is a private school that is not under contract to the government and so has freedom to set its own curriculum and teaching methods.
Students and their parents are screened to ensure they agree that a child who is learning is a happy child. The school's teachers write the textbooks.
The school uses structure and repetition in its classes.
Constant repetition of content in oral and written questions includes reviews of what was learned in a day, a week and a year.

In 2017, Hattemer joined the international NACE Schools group.

Notable alumni
The walls of the school are lined with photographs of famous alumni, including Brigitte Bardot, Jacques Chirac, Christophe Dechavanne, Jean d'Ormesson, Michel Polnareff, Véronique Sanson and Anne Sinclair.
Other notable alumni include:

Aga Khan IV (born 1936), businessman, Imam of Nizari Ismailism
Bảo Đại (1913–97), last emperor of Vietnam
Alain Calmat (born 1940), skater, surgeon, politician
Claude Cheysson (1920–2012), politician
Bruno Cremer (1929–2010), actor 
Bernard Debré (born 1944), urologist, politician
Patrick Dewaere (1947–82), film actor
Dominique Frémy (1931–2008), creator of the Quid encyclopedia
Jacques Friedel  (1921–2014), physicist, material scientist
Jacques de Lacretelle (1888–1985), novelist
Jacques Laffite (born 1943), racing driver, TV commentator 
 Bertrand Meyer (born 1950), computer scientist
Christine Ockrent (born 1944), journalist 
Michel Poniatowski (1922–2002), politician
Anne Queffélec (born 1948), classical pianist
Rainier III, Prince of Monaco (1923–2005), ruler of Monaco 
Édouard de Rothschild (born 1957), businessman 
Françoise Sagan (1935–2004), playwright, novelist
Jean-Paul Sartre (1905–80), philosopher, playwright, novelist
Princess Stéphanie of Monaco (born 1965), singer, fashion model.

Notes

Sources

Private schools in France
Buildings and structures in the 8th arrondissement of Paris
1885 establishments in France
Educational institutions established in 1885